Allen J. Payton (March 7, 1861–March 1, 1917) was an American farmer and politician. He represented Spencer County in the Indiana General Assembly.

Early life and education

Allen J. Payton was born in Indiana March 7, 1861.

Career and life

Payton worked as a farmer. He operated a farm in Luce Township, Indiana in 1880. On June 3, 1881, he married Anna Stevenson. The couple would go on to have five children.

Life in politics

Payton ran for the Indiana General Assembly, to represent Spencer County, in the 1888 election, running against Benjamin B. Brown. Payton won the election after an investigation into voter fraud.

Later life

Around 1900, Payton served on a committee to place historical markers at select sites in Spencer County where Abraham Lincoln or his family resided or spent time.

By 1910, Payton was serving on the board of the Independent Telephone Association. Payton died in Evansville, Indiana on March 1, 1917.

Legacy
A collection of Payton's letters are held in the collection of the Indiana State Library.

References

1917 deaths
1860s births
Farmers from Indiana
Members of the Indiana House of Representatives
People from Rockport, Indiana